Mathai Manjooran (13 October 1912 – 14 January 1970) was an Indian independence activist from Kerala, socialist revolutionary, founder of the Kerala Socialist Party, Member of Parliament, Minister of Labour (economics) in the second E.M.S. Namboodiripad communist ministry, and above all a proponent for the formation of the Kerala State.

Manjooran was a graduate of Madras University.He was alumni of St Thomas College, Thrissur

References

Kaalathinu Munpae Nadanna Manjooran – by K.M. Roy.
Keraleeyathayum Mattum (Published by D.C. Books)_ by P. K. Balakrishnan.
Ente Vazhiyambalangal (Published by Poorna Publications, Calicut)- by S.K. Pottakkat.

External links
 The Hindu Archives
 Kerala Niyamasabha Archives

Members of the Kerala Legislative Assembly
Indian independence activists from Kerala
Malayali politicians
1912 births
1970 deaths
St. Thomas College, Thrissur alumni
Rajya Sabha members from Kerala